The women's 10,000 metres event at the 2022 African Championships in Athletics was held on 11 August in Port Louis, Mauritius.

Results

References

2022 African Championships in Athletics
10,000 metres at the African Championships in Athletics